Miranda Ranieri, (born 20 April 1986 in Toronto, Ontario) is a professional squash player who represents Canada. She reached a career-high world ranking of World No. 43 in May 2012.
She won three medals at the 2011 Pan American Games, a gold in the team event and two bronzes in the singles and doubles.

References

External links 

Canadian female squash players
Living people
1986 births
Sportspeople from Toronto
Pan American Games gold medalists for Canada
Pan American Games bronze medalists for Canada
Pan American Games medalists in squash
Squash players at the 2011 Pan American Games
Medalists at the 2011 Pan American Games
21st-century Canadian women